The Campbell University College of Pharmacy & Health Sciences is an American pharmacy school founded in 1985 by Dean Ronald Maddox and located in Buies Creek, North Carolina.  The College is one of seven schools that compose Campbell University. In 2009, the school's name was changed to Campbell University College of Pharmacy and Health Sciences.

The Campbell University College of Pharmacy & Health Sciences launched a physician assistant program in August 2011, a public health program in August 2012, a physical therapy program in January 2014, and an undergraduate nursing program in August 2014. A proposed doctor of occupational therapy program was announced in September 2014.

Centers and Programs
The College of Pharmacy and Health Sciences consists of four different centers that each have their respective programs. The four different centers are: the Drug Information Center, the Pharmaceutical Education & Research Center, Science Education Outreach, and the Wellness Institute.
 
The Drug Information Center (DIC) was established in 1987 with a grant from GlaxoSmithKline. The director of the DIC is PharmD Connie Lee Barnes and the associate director is PharmD Valerie B. Clinard. The DIC provides experiential training for student pharmacists and a service to health care professionals. The DIC has many purposes to the CPHS like:
 To serve the health professions community by answering drug-related questions
 To provide a learning center for student pharmacists in drug information skills
 To aid in the promotion of CPHS by offering drug information services throughout the state
 To promote the profession of pharmacy
The DIC also provides services that are free of charge. These services consist of:
 Provision of drug information and supporting documentation to questions posed by health care practitioners
 Provision of consultative services in the areas of adverse drug-reaction reporting, formulary management and education seminars
 Participation in pharmacy-related research

The Pharmaceutical Education & Research Center (PERC) is a part of the Department of Pharmaceutical Sciences at Campbell University's College of Pharmacy & Health Sciences. PERC is housed within the College of Pharmacy & Health Sciences' (CPHS) Pharmacy Research Facility, and is equipped with the same technology and equipment currently utilized in the pharmaceutical industry. In addition to being an extension of the Department's education and research mission, the Center offers a wide variety of services to other universities, pharmacies, pharma & bio-pharma industries, and government agencies.

The Science Education Outreach is mainly for middle school and high school students. This program exposes these students to various career options in science. Another effort of this program is to help better middle school and high school teachers to improve their teaching methods. This program runs workshops and clinics so that the teachers will learn how to better teach their students.

The Wellness Institute program helps middle school students better learn about their health and habits and how they can make better choices to be healthier. This program also helps with consumer education, health care professionals, and the diabetes care project.

Student organizations
There are many student organizations in the College of Pharmacy & Health Sciences. These organizations all help better students in the area of their education and provides these students with an opportunity after they graduate from college. These organizations are: 
 Academy of Managed Care Pharmacy (AMCP),
 Academy of Student Pharmacists (ASP),
 American Association of Pharmaceutical Scientists (AAPS),
 American Society of Consultant Pharmacists (ASCP),
 Christian Pharmacists Fellowship International (CPFI),
 Clinical Research Student Advisory Board (CRSAB),
 International Society of Pharmaceutical Engineering (ISPE),
 Kappa Epsilon (KE),
 Kappa Psi Pharmaceutical Fraternity,
 National Community Pharmacists Association (NCPA),
 Pharmacy Alumni Student Association (PASA),
 Pharmacy Legislative Interest Group (PLIG),
 Pharmacy Student Executive Board (PSEB),
 Phi Delta Chi fraternity,
 Phi Lambda Sigma,
 Rho Chi Pharmaceutical Honor Society,
 Student National Pharmaceutical Association (SNPhA),
 Student Society of Health-System Pharmacists (SSHP).

Undergraduate programs

Campbell University College of Pharmacy & Health Sciences offers one of the premier pre-pharmacy programs in the United States as well as a bachelor's and master's degrees in pharmaceutical sciences and clinical research.
 Pre-Pharmacy
 Bachelor of Science in Clinical Research (BSCR)
 Pharmaceutical Sciences (BSPS)
 Bachelor of Science in Nursing (BSN)

Graduate programs
 Athletic Training
 Clinical Research
 Pharmaceutical Sciences (MSPS)
 Doctor of Pharmacy
 Doctor of Physical Therapy
 Physician Assistant Practice
 Public Health

References

External links
Campbell University School of Pharmacy home page

Campbell University
Pharmacy schools in North Carolina
Pharmacy schools in the United States
Educational institutions established in 1985
1985 establishments in North Carolina